Parliamentary elections were held in Tajikistan on 1 March 2015.

Electoral system
The 63 members of the Assembly of Representatives were elected by two methods: 41 members were elected in single-member constituencies using the two-round system, whilst 22 seats were elected by proportional representation in a single nationwide constituency, with an electoral threshold of 5%.

Campaign
A total of 288 candidates contested the elections.

Conduct
The Organization for Security and Co-operation in Europe sent observers to the elections. None of the elections in Tajikistan since 1992 were judged either free or fair by international observers.

Results

References

Tajikistan
Elections in Tajikistan
Parliamentary
Election and referendum articles with incomplete results